Enixotrophon similidroueti is a species of sea snail, a marine gastropod mollusk in the family Muricidae, the murex snails or rock snails.

Description

Distribution

References

 Houart R., Kilburn R.N. & Marais A.P. (2010) Muricidae. pp. 176–270, in: Marais A.P. & Seccombe A.D. (eds), Identification guide to the seashells of South Africa. Volume 1. Groenkloof: Centre for Molluscan Studies. 376 pp.

External links
 Houart, R. (1989). New data on the Trophoninae (Gastropoda: Muricidae) in southern Africa with the description of two new species. Apex. 4(3): 49–55.
 Barco, A.; Marshall, B.; A. Houart, R.; Oliverio, M. (2015). Molecular phylogenetics of Haustrinae and Pagodulinae (Neogastropoda: Muricidae) with a focus on New Zealand species. Journal of Molluscan Studies. 81(4): 476–488

Enixotrophon
Gastropods described in 1989